Hoštice is the name of several locations in the Czech Republic:

 Hoštice (Kroměříž District), a village in the Zlín Region
 Hoštice (Strakonice District), a village in the South Bohemian Region
 Hoštice-Heroltice, a village and municipality (obec) in Vyškov District in the South Moravian Region of the Czech Republic

Alternatively:

 Horní Hoštice (Javorník)
 Střelské Hoštice
 Šumavské Hoštice
 Velké Hoštice

See also:
 Hostice